Season 2007–08 was Airdrie United's sixth competitive season. They competed in the Second Division, Challenge Cup, League Cup and the Scottish Cup.

Summary
Airdrie United finished second in the Second Division, entering the play-offs losing 3–0 to Clyde on aggregate. Despite losing in the playoff, they were promoted to the first division due to Gretna's forced relegation due to going into administration and being unable to prove they could complete fixtures. They reached the fourth round of the Scottish Cup, the first round of the League Cup and reached the quarterfinal of the Challenge Cup losing 2–0 to Dunfermline Athletic.

League table

Results and fixtures

Second Division

First Division play-offs

Challenge Cup

League Cup

Scottish Cup

Player statistics

Squad 

|}

a.  Includes other competitive competitions, including playoffs and the Scottish Challenge Cup.

References

2007–08
Airdrie United